Khaveh (also Romanized as Khāveh and Khāweh) is a village in Fordu Rural District, Kahak District, Qom County, Qom Province, Iran. At the 2016 census, its population was 813, in 264 families.

References 

Populated places in Qom Province